Immigrants is a 1948 drama film directed by and starring Aldo Fabrizi.

Plot
At war's end, Giuseppe emigrates to Argentina.

Cast
 Aldo Fabrizi as Giuseppe Bordoni
 Ave Ninchi as Adele Bordoni
 Nando Bruno as Gigi
 Loredana as Maria Bordoni
 Adolfo Celi as Il professore
 Eduardo Passarelli as Gennarino
 Iván Grondona
 Giuseppe Rinaldi
 Michele Malaspina
 Rino Salviati

References

External links

1948 films
1940s Italian-language films
1948 drama films
Italian black-and-white films
Films directed by Aldo Fabrizi
Films about immigration to Argentina
Italian drama films
1940s Italian films